Parapseudinae is an estuarine subfamily of crustacean in the order Tanaidacea.

Genera 
According to the World Register of Marine Species, the following genera are accepted within Parapseudinae:

 Akanthoparapseudes Heard & Morales-Núñez, 2011
 Aponychos Bamber, Chatterjee & Marshall, 2012
 Ascumnella Gutu & Heard, 2002
 Brachylicoa Gutu, 2006
 Ctenapseudes Bamber, Ariyananda & Silva, 1997
 Discapseudes Bacescu & Gutu, 1975
 Gutuapseudes Edgar, 1997
 Hainanius Bamber, 1999
 Halmyrapseudes Bacescu & Gutu, 1974
 Longiflagrum Gutu, 1995
 Longipedis Larsen & Shimomura, 2006
 Parapseudes Sars, 1882
 Podictenius Gutu, 2006
 Pseudoapseudes Gutu, 1981
 Pseudohalmyrapseudes Larsen & Hansknecht, 2004
 Remexudes Błażewicz-Paszkowycz & Bamber, 2007
 Saltipedis Gutu, 1995

References 

Tanaidacea
Crustaceans of Australia
Crustaceans described in 2008